Anelosimus kohi is a species of spider in the family Theridiidae. It is found in Singapore and Malaysia.  The species is named for Joseph K. H. Koh, an entomologist from Singapore who collected the holotype specimen.

Description 
There are two coloration patterns found in this species, one uniformly reddish brown abdomen with a dark brown dorsal folium and the other grey abdomen bordered by a bright yellow band and a red dorsal folium. The holotype has the latter coloration pattern.

This species is also noted for a highly variable genitalia, although differences do not appear to vary by collection site or coloration pattern.  The continuous range of variation, together with genetic data, has led to all specimens being combined in one species.

Habitat 
Anelosimus kohi builds basket webs in trees, generally at the tips of the branches.  It inhabits trees close to beaches.  Nests appear to consist of a single female spider and sub-adult offspring.  The spider appears to be sub-social.

References 

Theridiidae
Spiders of Oceania
Spiders of Asia
Spiders described in 1993